Gao Xiumin (born August 21, 1963) is a former female Chinese handball player who competed in the 1984 Summer Olympics.

She was a member of the Chinese handball team which won the bronze medal. She played three matches and scored three goals.

External links
profile

1963 births
Living people
Chinese female handball players
Handball players at the 1984 Summer Olympics
Olympic bronze medalists for China
Olympic handball players of China
Olympic medalists in handball
Medalists at the 1984 Summer Olympics
20th-century Chinese women